Hacarí  is a Colombian municipality located in the department of North Santander.

References
 Government of Norte de Santander - Hacari

Municipalities of the Norte de Santander Department